The 2022 United States House of Representatives elections in Georgia were held on November 8, 2022, to elect the 14 U.S. representatives from the state of Georgia, one from each of the state's congressional districts. The elections coincided with the Georgia gubernatorial election, as well as other elections to the U.S. House of Representatives, elections to the U.S. Senate, and various state and local elections.

Results summary

Statewide

District
Results of the 2022 United States House of Representatives elections in Georgia by district:

District 1 

The 1st district is based in the Southeast corner of the state, encompassing Savannah and lower areas. Republican Buddy Carter, who has represented the district since 2015, was re-elected with 58.3% of the vote in 2020. Carter is running for re-election.

Republican primary

Candidates

Nominee 
Buddy Carter, incumbent U.S. Representative

Results

Democratic primary

Candidates

Nominee 
Wade Herring, attorney

Eliminated in runoff 
Joyce Griggs, Retired Lt. Col., businesswoman, and nominee for this seat in 2020

Eliminated in primary 
Michelle Munroe, nurse/midwife and veteran

Endorsements

Results

Primary runoff results

General election

Predictions

Results

District 2 

The 2nd district encompasses the Southwest corner of the state, including most of Columbus. Democrat Sanford Bishop, who has represented the district since 1993, was re-elected with 59.1% of the vote in 2020. Bishop is running for re-election.

Democratic primary

Candidates

Nominee 
Sanford Bishop, incumbent U.S. representative

Eliminated in primary 
Joseph O'Hara

Endorsements

Results

Republican primary

Candidates

Nominee 
Chris West, attorney

Eliminated in runoff 
Jeremy Hunt, former U.S. Army captain

Eliminated in primary 
Vivian Childs, businesswoman and former educator
Wayne Johnson, former chief operating officer of the Office of Federal Student Aid and candidate for U.S. Senate in 2020
Rich Robertson, attorney
Paul Whitehead, teacher

Withdrawn 
Tracy Taylor, firefighter

Endorsements

Results

Primary runoff results

General election

Predictions

Polling

Results

District 3 

The 3rd district comprises central-west Georgia, containing the Northern suburbs of Columbus. Republican Drew Ferguson, who has represented the district since 2017, was re-elected with 65.0% of the vote in 2020. He is running for re-election.

Republican primary

Candidates

Nominee 
Drew Ferguson, incumbent U.S. representative

Eliminated in primary 
Jared Benjamin Craig, attorney

Results

Democratic primary

Candidates

Nominee 
Val Almonord, retired physician and nominee for Georgia's 3rd congressional district in 2020

Results

General election

Predictions

Results

District 4 

The 4th district is based in the Southeast suburbs and regions of Atlanta. Incumbent Democrat Hank Johnson, who has represented the district since 2007, was re-elected with 80.1% of the vote in 2020, and he has declared his candidacy for re-election.

Democratic primary

Candidates

Nominee 
Hank Johnson, incumbent U.S. representative

Endorsements

Results

Republican primary

Candidates

Nominee 
Jonathan Chavez, clinical director of operations

Eliminated in primary 
Surrea Ivy, manager and activist

Results

General election

Predictions

Results

District 5 

The 5th district comprises most of central Atlanta. Incumbent Democrat Nikema Williams, who has represented the district since 2021, was elected with 85.1% of the vote in 2020, and she has declared her candidacy for re-election.

Democratic primary

Candidates

Nominee
Nikema Williams, incumbent U.S. representative

Eliminated in primary 
Charlotte Macbagito, commercial real estate underwriter
Valencia Stovall, former state representative and independent candidate for U.S. Senate in 2020 (special)

Endorsements

Results

Republican primary

Candidates

Nominee 
Christian Zimm, attorney

Results

General election

Predictions

Results

District 6 

The new 6th district comprises suburban and rural regions north of Atlanta. The incumbent is Democrat Lucy McBath, who has represented the district since 2019, and she was re-elected with 54.6% of the vote in 2020. She ran for re-election in Georgia's 7th congressional district as the new 6th district heavily favored the Republican Party.

Republican primary

Candidates

Nominee
Rich McCormick, physician and nominee for Georgia's 7th congressional district in 2020

Eliminated in runoff 
Jake Evans, former chairman of the Georgia Ethics Commission and son of former U.S. Ambassador to Luxembourg Randy Evans

Eliminated in primary 
Byron Gatewood, businessman and veteran
Meagan Hanson, former state representative
Blake Harbin, businessman and candidate for this seat in 2020
Mary Mallory Staples, teacher
Paulette Smith, candidate for this seat in 2020
Suzi Voyles, chairwoman of conservative group Maggie's List
Eugene Yu, businessman and perennial candidate

Withdrawn 
Harold Earls, author and veteran
Eric Welsh, retired U.S. Army colonel and former Coca-Cola executive
Elfreda Desvignes

Declined 
Will Wade, state representative

Endorsements

Polling

Results

Primary runoff Results

Democratic primary

Candidates

Nominee 
Bob Christian, veteran

Eliminated in primary 
Wayne White, consultant

Declined 
Lucy McBath, incumbent U.S. representative (running in the 7th District)

Endorsements

Results

General election

Predictions

Results

District 7 

The 7th district comprises suburbs and exurbs of Atlanta. The incumbent is Democrat Carolyn Bourdeaux, who has represented the district since 2021. She flipped the district and was elected with 51.4% of the vote in 2020. Bourdeaux ran for reelection, losing a primary challenge from the 6th district's Representative Lucy McBath, who opted to change districts after hers was redrawn during redistricting to heavily favor Republicans. McBath then won the general election.

Democratic primary

Candidates

Nominee 
Lucy McBath, incumbent U.S. representative for the 6th district

Eliminated in primary 
Donna McLeod, state representative
Carolyn Bourdeaux, incumbent U.S representative

Endorsements

Polling 

Runoff polling

Results

Republican primary

Candidates

Nominee
Mark Gonsalves, businessman

Eliminated in runoff 
Michael Corbin, Telecommunications Network Integration director

Eliminated in primary 
Lisa McCoy, college professor
YG Nyghtstorm, security executive
Mary West, business executive

Withdrawn
Rich McCormick, physician and nominee for Georgia's 7th congressional district in 2020 (Running in Georgia's 6th congressional district)
Eugene Chin Yu (Running in Georgia's 6th congressional district)

Endorsements

Results

Primary runoff Results

General election

Predictions

Results

District 8 

The 8th district comprises a large sliver of the southern part of the state. Incumbent Republican Austin Scott, who has represented the district since 2011, was re-elected with 64.5% of the vote in 2020. He has declared his candidacy for re-election.

Republican primary

Candidates

Nominee 
Austin Scott, incumbent U.S. representative

Withdrawn 
Michael Reece

Results

Democratic primary

Candidates

Nominee 
Darrius Butler, pastor

Results

Independent and third-party candidates

Libertarian party

Filed paperwork 
Mark Mosley

Green Party

Withdrawn 
Jimmy Cooper (running for State Representative district 145)

General election

Predictions

Results

District 9 

The 9th district encompasses the northeast part of the state. Incumbent Republican Andrew Clyde, who has represented the district since 2021 and was elected with 78.6% of the vote in 2020, is running for re-election.

Republican primary

Candidates

Nominee 
Andrew Clyde, incumbent U.S. representative

Eliminated in primary 
Michael Boggus, crane operator
Gregory Howard, businessman
John London, pastor
Ben Souther, businessman and former FBI agent

Results

Democratic primary

Candidates

Nominee 
Michael Ford, attorney and chair of the Hall County Democratic Party

Results

General election

Predictions

Results

District 10 

The 10th district encompasses a large portion of the central-east part of the state. Incumbent Republican Jody Hice, who has represented the district since 2015, was re-elected with 62.3% of the vote in 2020. Hice is not running for re-election, instead opting to run in the 2022 Georgia Secretary of State election.

Republican primary

Candidates

Nominee
Mike Collins, trucking executive and son of former U.S. Representative Mac Collins

Eliminated in runoff 
Vernon Jones, former state representative (1993–2001, 2017–2021, Democratic until 2020) and CEO of DeKalb County (2001–2009) (previously filed to run for Governor)

Eliminated in primary 
Timothy Barr, state representative
Paul Broun, physician and former U.S. Representative
David Curry, former state revenue commissioner
Marc McMain, publisher
Alan Sims, retired Air Force colonel
Mitchell Swan, Marine Corps veteran

Withdrawn
Andrew Alvey (endorsed Mitchell Swan)
Todd Heussner, retired Army colonel
Matt Richards, businessman (endorsed Mike Collins)
Patrick Witt, former Trump administration official (endorsed Vernon Jones, running for insurance commissioner)
Charles V. Rupert

Declined
Jody Hice, incumbent U.S. representative (ran for Secretary of State)

Endorsements

Polling

Results

Primary runoff results

Democratic primary

Candidates

Nominee 
Tabitha Johnson-Green, registered nurse and nominee for Georgia's 10th congressional district in 2018 and 2020

Eliminated in runoff 
 Jessica Fore, activist for victims of domestic violence

Eliminated in primary 
Femi Oduwole, software engineer
Paul Walton, mayor of Hull
 Phyllis Hatcher, pastor and businesswoman

Results

Primary runoff results

General election

Predictions

Results

District 11 

The 11th district is based in the Northern exurbs of Atlanta. Incumbent Republican Barry Loudermilk, who has represented the district since 2015 and was re-elected with 60.4% of the vote in 2020, announced he is running for re-election.

Republican primary

Candidates

Nominee 
Barry Loudermilk, incumbent U.S. representative

Results

Democratic primary

Candidates

Nominee 
Antonio Daza-Fernandez, business owner

Results

Independent and third-party candidates

Independents

Filed paperwork 
Angela Grace Davis

General election

Predictions

Results

District 12 

The 12th district is based in the central-east part of the state, surrounding Augusta. Incumbent Republican Rick Allen, who has represented the district since 2015, was re-elected with 58.4% of the vote in 2020. He is running for re-election.

Republican primary

Candidates

Nominee 
Rick Allen, incumbent U.S. representative

Results

Democratic primary

Candidates

Nominee 
Elizabeth Johnson, retired insurance professional and nominee for Insurance and Safety Fire Commissioner in 2014 and Georgia's 12th congressional district in 2020

Results

General election

Predictions

Results

District 13 

The 13th district is based in the southwest suburbs and exurbs of Atlanta. Incumbent Democrat David Scott, who has represented the district since 2003, was re-elected with 77.4% of the vote in 2020. He is running for re-election.

Democratic primary

Candidates

Nominee 
David Scott, incumbent U.S. representative

Eliminated in primary 
Vincent Fort, former State Senator (1996–2017) and candidate for mayor of Atlanta in 2017
Mark Baker, member of the South Fulton City Council
Shastity Driscoll, consultant

Withdrawn 
Antonio Darnell Gray

Endorsements

Results

Republican primary

Candidates

Nominee 
Caesar Gonzales, aerospace engineer and candidate for this seat in 2020

Eliminated in primary 
Dominika Hawkins, consultant
Calina Plotky, attorney

Results

Independent and third-party candidates

Libertarian Party

Filed paperwork 
Martin Lindsey Cowen III

General election

Predictions

Results

District 14 

The 14th district is based in the northwest corner of the state. Incumbent Republican Marjorie Taylor Greene, who has represented the district since 2021, was elected with 74.7% of the vote in 2020. Greene is running for re-election, after winning a legal challenge to her eligibility based on her alleged involvement in organizing and promoting the 2021 United States Capitol attack, based on the Fourteenth Amendment to the United States Constitution, which bars people who have engaged in insurrection from serving in Congress. While Greene won by a comfortable margin, this was the worst showing ever by a republican in the 14th district, and the best performance of a Democrat in this district, being the first time since the district was created that the Democrat got more than 28% of the vote.

Republican primary

Candidates

Nominee 
Marjorie Taylor Greene, incumbent U.S. representative

Eliminated in primary 
Eric Cunningham, sales executive
James Haygood, farmer
Charles Lutin, physician and veteran
Jennifer Strahan, CEO of J. Osley & Co.
Seth Synstelien, educator

Withdrawn 
Mark Daniel Clay

Polling

Endorsements

Results

Democratic primary

Candidates

Nominee 
Marcus Flowers, veteran

Eliminated in primary 
Wendy Davis, Rome city commissioner
Holly McCormack, insurance agent

Withdrawn 
Lateefah Conner (endorsed Davis)

Endorsements

Results

Independent and third-party candidates

Libertarian Party

Declared 
Angela Pence

General election

Predictions

Results

Notes

Partisan clients

References

External links
Official campaign websites for 1st district candidates
Buddy Carter (R) for Congress
Wade Herring (D) for Congress

Official campaign websites for 2nd district candidates
Sanford Bishop (D) for Congress
Chris West (R) for Congress

Official campaign websites for 3rd district candidates
Val Almonord (D) for Congress
Drew Ferguson (R) for Congress

Official campaign websites for 4th district candidates
Jonathan Chavez (R) for Congress
Hank Johnson (D) for Congress

Official campaign websites for 5th district candidates
Nikema Williams (D) for Congress
Christian Zimm (R) for Congress

Official campaign websites for 6th district candidates
Bob Christian (D) for Congress
Rich McCormick (R) for Congress

Official campaign websites for 7th district candidates
Michael Corbin (R) for Congress
Lucy McBath (D) for Congress

Official campaign websites for 8th district candidates
Darrius Butler (D) for Congress
Austin Scott (R) for Congress

Official campaign websites for 9th district candidates
Andrew Clyde (R) for Congress
Mike Ford (D) for Congress

Official campaign websites for 10th district candidates
Mike Collins (R) for Congress
Tabitha Johnson-Green (D) for Congress

Official campaign websites for 11th district candidates
Angela Grace Davis (I) for Congress
Antonio Miguel Daza-Fernandez (D) for Congress
Barry Loudermilk (R) for Congress

Official campaign websites for 12th district candidates
Rick Allen (R) for Congress
Elizabeth Johnson (D) for Congress

Official campaign websites for 13th district candidates
Martin Lindsey Cowen III (L) for Congress
David Scott (D) for Congress

Official campaign websites for 14th district candidates
Marcus Flowers (D) for Congress
Marjorie Taylor Greene (R) for Congress
Angela Pence (L) for Congress

2022
Georgia
United States House of Representatives